The Peru Peak Wilderness is one of eight wilderness areas in the Green Mountain National Forest in the U.S. state of Vermont. It was created by the Vermont Wilderness Act of 1984 and later expanded by the New England Wilderness Act of 2006.

The Long Trail (which coincides with the Appalachian Trail in this region) enters the wilderness at Mad Tom Notch on its southern edge, crossing over Styles Peak and Peru Peak before exiting the area on its western edge. The northern half of Peru Peak Wilderness is remote with no marked trails. In particular, Pete Parent Peak has no marked path to the top.

See also

 List of largest wilderness areas in the United States
 List of wilderness areas of the United States
 National Wilderness Preservation System
 Wilderness Act
 White Rocks National Recreation Area

References

Wilderness areas of Vermont
IUCN Category Ib
Protected areas of Bennington County, Vermont
Protected areas of Rutland County, Vermont
Green Mountain National Forest
Protected areas established in 1984
1984 establishments in Vermont